Thomas Bonde (fl. c.1400) was the member of Parliament for Malmesbury for the parliament of 1402.

References 

Members of the Parliament of England for Malmesbury
Year of birth unknown
Year of death unknown
English MPs 1402